Chaqa (also Romanized as Chaqā; also known as Chaghā and Cheqā’) is a village in Barf Anbar Rural District, in the Central District of Fereydunshahr County, Isfahan Province, Iran. At the 2006 census, its population was 1,200, in 257 families.

References 

Populated places in Fereydunshahr County